Felice Mueller (born October 15, 1989) is an American rower. She won the gold medal in the coxless four at the 2013 World Rowing Championships. Her rowing career began at the Pomfret School. From there, she attended and rowed at the University of Michigan from 2008 to 2012. She won a bronze medal at the 2019 World Rowing Championships in the Women’s Eights.

References

External links
Felice Mueller at USRowing

1989 births
Living people
American female rowers
Sportspeople from Cleveland
World Rowing Championships medalists for the United States
Sportspeople from Shaker Heights, Ohio
Olympic rowers of the United States
Rowers at the 2016 Summer Olympics
University of Michigan alumni
Pomfret School alumni
21st-century American women